Chester High School is an urban, public high school located in Chester, Delaware County, Pennsylvania, United States with a ZIP code of 19013-4288. Chester is a part of the Chester-Upland School District. The school serves the City of Chester, Chester Township, and Upland. In 2018–2019, the school had 994 pupils.

History

The first Chester High School building was erected in 1902.

Extracurriculars 
The district offers a wide variety of clubs, activities and sports. Sports programs include; football, basketball, volleyball, cheerleading, baseball, tennis, track and club activities. This school has a long-standing tradition of Championship wins in basketball.  The Clippers have won eight state championships: 1983, 1989, 1994, 2000, 2005, 2008, 2011 and 2012. Chester was state runner-up in 1954, 1955, 1957, 1959, 1966, 1967, 1972, 2003, 2007 and 2013.  Since the 1981-82 season, Chester has qualified for the state tournament every year except for 1991-92.

Notable alumni
Louis A. Bloom, Pennsylvania State Representative for Delaware County (1947-1952), Judge of the Pennsylvania Court of Common Pleas, Delaware County
Ethel Hampson Brewster, philologist and professor at Swarthmore College
E. Wallace Chadwick, U.S. Representative from Pennsylvania 
Tom Chism, professional baseball player 
Walter H. Craig, Pennsylvania State Representative for Delaware County (1923-1925)
John V. Diggins, former Delaware County Court president judge
Tyreke Evans, Guard, Memphis Grizzlies
Negley Farson, author and journalist
Lenora Fulani, psychologist, psychotherapist and political activist
Fredia Gibbs, Martial artist, kickboxer, boxer
Darrin Govens, Guard, St. Joseph University
Herman Harris, professional basketball player
Ron Henry, professional baseball player 
Rahlir Hollis-Jefferson, professional basketball player for the Saint John Mill Rats of the NBL 
Rondae Hollis-Jefferson, professional basketball player for the Brooklyn Nets
Will Hunter, Safety, Minnesota Vikings
Thaddeus Kirkland, Pennsylvania State Representative and Mayor of Chester
Wilbur Kirkland, professional basketball player
Lew Krausse Jr., professional baseball player 
Albert Dutton MacDade, Pennsylvania State Senator and Judge in the Delaware County Court of Common Pleas
Danny Murtaugh, professional baseball player, coach and manager 
Jameer Nelson, Guard, Orlando Magic and St. Joseph's University
Curly Ogden, professional baseball player 
Jack Ogden, professional baseball player 
Johnny Podgajny, professional baseball player 
Joe Pyne, controversial talk show host from the 1950s and 1960s
George Raymond, president of the NAACP Chester branch from 1942 to 1977
Bo Ryan, Men's Basketball Coach, University of Wisconsin–Madison
Dawn Sowell, professional Track and Field athlete
William Cameron Sproul, 27th Governor of Pennsylvania
Ellwood J. Turner, Pennsylvania State Representative for Delaware County (1925-1948), 119th Speaker of the Pennsylvania House of Representatives (1939-1941)
Horace Walker, former NBA Forward
William Ward Jr., Pennsylvania State Representative and two term mayor of Chester
Robert C. Wright, Pennsylvania State Representative

References

External links

 Chester High School
 Chester High School Marine Corps JROTC

Public high schools in Pennsylvania
Schools in Delaware County, Pennsylvania
Public middle schools in Pennsylvania
Magnet schools in Pennsylvania
Chester, Pennsylvania